Christine Bøe Jensen (born 3 June 1975 in Hammerfest) is a Norwegian former footballer and Olympic champion, born in Hammerfest.

Jensen's first club was HIF-Stein in her native Finnmark. She later moved to Tromsø and turned out for Kvaløysletta and Fløya, before linking up with Grand Bodø. In 2000, she broke into the Norway women's national football team as a Grand Bodø player and was included in the gold medal-winning squad at the 2000 Summer Olympics in Sydney.

On the back of that success Jensen secured a transfer to Kolbotn in 2001. In 2002, she was top goalscorer with 19 as Kolbotn won the Toppserien title. She later played for Manglerud Star and Vålerenga.

References

External links
 
 National team statistics 

1975 births
Living people
Norwegian women's footballers
Footballers at the 2000 Summer Olympics
Olympic footballers of Norway
Olympic gold medalists for Norway
People from Hammerfest
Olympic medalists in football
Vålerenga Fotball Damer players
IF Fløya players
Kolbotn Fotball players
Toppserien players
Medalists at the 2000 Summer Olympics
Norway women's international footballers
Women's association football midfielders
Sportspeople from Troms og Finnmark